The 1988–89 Cypriot Second Division was the 34th season of the Cypriot second-level football league. Evagoras Paphos won their 4th title.

Format
Fifteen teams participated in the 1988–89 Cypriot Second Division. All teams played against each other twice, once at their home and once away. The team with the most points at the end of the season crowned champions. The first two teams were promoted to 1989–90 Cypriot First Division. The last three teams were relegated to the 1989–90 Cypriot Third Division.

Changes from previous season
Teams promoted to 1988–89 Cypriot First Division
 Keravnos Strovolou FC
 Omonia Aradippou

Teams relegated from 1987–88 Cypriot First Division
 APEP FC
 Alki Larnaca FC
 Anagennisi Deryneia FC

Teams promoted from 1987–88 Cypriot Third Division
 Digenis Akritas Morphou FC
 Chalkanoras Idaliou

Teams relegated to 1988–89 Cypriot Third Division
 Digenis Akritas Ipsona
 PAEEK FC
 Othellos Athienou FC

League standings

See also
 Cypriot Second Division
 1988–89 Cypriot First Division
 1988–89 Cypriot Cup

References

Cypriot Second Division seasons
Cyprus
1988–89 in Cypriot football